Sérgio Vieira Galdino (born 7 May 1969 in Armazém, Santa Catarina) is a Brazilian race walker.

Personal bests
20 km: 1:19:56 hrs NR –  Eisenhüttenstadt, 14 May 1995
50 km: 3:58:58 hrs –  Porto Alegre, 26 April 2003

Achievements

1Disqualified in the final

References

External links
Sports reference biography

1969 births
Living people
Brazilian male racewalkers
Athletes (track and field) at the 1992 Summer Olympics
Athletes (track and field) at the 1996 Summer Olympics
Athletes (track and field) at the 2000 Summer Olympics
Athletes (track and field) at the 1991 Pan American Games
Athletes (track and field) at the 1995 Pan American Games
Athletes (track and field) at the 2003 Pan American Games
Olympic athletes of Brazil
Pan American Games athletes for Brazil
21st-century Brazilian people